Wall Lake may refer to:

Wall Lake, Iowa, a city in Iowa
Wall Lake, Minnesota, an unincorporated community in Minnesota
Wall Lake (Minnesota), a lake near Wall Lake, Minnesota
A lake near Orland, Indiana
A lake near Delton, Michigan

See also
 Walled Lake (disambiguation)